Cake is the debut studio album by Scottish pop/rock band The Trash Can Sinatras, released in 1990.

The album peaked at No. 74 on the UK Albums Chart.

Production
The album was recorded at Shabby Road, the band's studio that was paid for with their record advance.

Critical reception
Trouser Press called the album "exceptionally good" and "pristine-sounding," writing that the producers add "an occasional light brush of cool jazz to the folky spines of the band’s witty and agile tunes." Entertainment Weekly wrote: "Loaded with bright splashes of guitar and vocal harmonies, the five-member Scottish group Trash Can Sinatras’ debut album is breezy pop with a backbeat and mercifully little attitude." The Los Angeles Times called the album "tasty but hardly gripping." The Washington Post wrote that Cake "crafts elegant neo-pop soundscapes from little more than vocal harmonies and chiming semi-acoustic guitar riffs and strums." Time called it "an excellent brand of pub pop: simple, insinuating melodies, lyrics with propulsive good humor."

Track listing

Personnel
The Trash Can Sinatras
Francis Reader - vocals
John Douglas, Paul Livingston - guitar
George McDaid - bass
Stephen Douglas - drums
with:
Clark Sorley - piano on "Maybe I Should Drive", "Thrupenny Tears" and "You Made Me Feel", keyboards on "Only Tongue Can Tell"
Ronnie Goodman - percussion on "Thrupenny Tears"
Audrey Riley - strings on "Thrupenny Tears" and "Funny"
Gavin McComb - cello on "The Best Man's Fall"
Clare Thompson - violin on "Only Tongue Can Tell"
Mags, Richeal Reader - backing vocals on "Circling the Circumference"

References

The Trash Can Sinatras albums
1990 debut albums
Albums produced by John Leckie
Albums produced by Roger Bechirian
London Records albums